lauren woods is an American artist who works with film, video, performance, and installation art that challenges the systems of oppression and power as they relate to race. She was raised in Dallas, Texas. She is a visiting lecturer at Southern Methodist University.

Woods holds undergraduate degrees from the University of North Texas and a 2006 Master of Fine Arts from the San Francisco Art Institute. Her site-specific installation A Dallas Drinking Fountain Project gained national attention. Her artwork has been exhibited both across the United States and internationally, including Washington D.C., San Francisco, Los Angeles, New York, Dallas, and Miami, as well as Puerto Rico, Taiwan, South Korea, Japan, Mali, and France.

A Dallas Drinking Fountain Project 
Woods launched A Dallas Drinking Fountain Project in 2013. The work is installed in a drinking fountain in the Dallas County Records Building. When the button to activate the water fountain is pressed, a clip of Civil Rights era protests is projected onto the fountain. The user is then made aware of the faded remains of the Jim Crow-era sign reading "Whites Only" that was discovered above the fountain in 2003. Woods was visiting Dallas at the time this discovery was made, and began formulating ideas for an installation centering around the fountain soon after. She first proposed the idea in 2005, envisioning an installation consisting of a functioning water fountain that would play a 45-second long clip of scenes from the struggle for civil rights. Originally, Woods envisioned that the water would not start dispensing until the sequence of scenes concluded, but this idea was nixed by commissioners. In 2009, Woods moved back to Dallas from San Francisco, her home of ten years, to complete work on A Dallas Drinking Fountain Project. She was seven months pregnant at the time.

The work drew attention to the history of segregation through intervention in a common space, something not possible off-site or in a museum. The work was both celebrated for initiating discussion and critiqued for Woods' choice of historical clips.

The project has fueled perspectives on the debate on Confederate statues, suggesting the sites be made into collaborative art-making spaces so as to better confront and address the United States' history of segregation.

Looking Down On My Soul 
This piece, created by Woods in 2015, is a silent single-channel video sculpture. It depicts a man dancing on loop juxtaposed against the backdrop of the 1963 Birmingham riots. The two foot tall video shows police officers spraying fire hoses in the background. This piece was acquired by the Nasher Sculpture Center in Dallas, Texas. The title of Woods' piece comes from a song by Flying Lotus featuring rapper Kendrick Lamar.

The Nasher Sculpture Center Microgrant 2016 

Woods was awarded $2000 to help fund her Texas bluebonnet project. This photo-based series will look closely at the correlation between Black bodies to both the natural landscape and built environment. She will be honoring Mothers Against Police Brutality and the lives that have been taken. 
Woods used the tradition of bluebonnet portraiture, she imaged Black Residents of Texas in bluebonnet fields. She incorporated not only  fragmented body parts but also images of members of Mothers Against Police Brutality who lost loved ones in Texas because of police violence. She also planted bluebonnet seeds at various sites around the city with historical and political significance, including the graves of the children of Mothers Against Police Brutality members.

(S)Port of San Francisco 
In her single-channel video piece, (S)Port of San Francisco, Woods creates an "ethno-fictive" study by turning her camera on white responses to an African-American dance group performance on the Embarcadero in San Francisco.

In an interview, Woods said that her work examines whiteness "through the platform of 'The Black Body' which is really a product of white psyche." In (S)Port, she zooms in on particular faces in the audience, slows down the speed, and adds a nostalgic musical fragment seemingly lifted from a midcentury Hollywood soundtrack, all of which creates a surreal landscape superimposed on the everyday scene. Here, the viewer can examine manifestations of this white psyche – "real" and/or "imagined" – in the audience members' body language, and perhaps in the viewer herself.

American Monument 
American Monument is an artwork that examines cultural conditions under which African Americans have lost their lives to police violence. American Monument, Archive I, is an interactive sound sculpture that allows visitors to play audio material of police brutality against African Americans. This audio material was gathered in 2018 when American Monument initiated an extensive Freedom of Information Act request process. The material gathered from that request include close readings of use-of-force reports, prosecutor reports, witness testimonies, 911 calls, bystander and body/dash cam videos that show dominant white culture justifying fatal police violence. Archive I is placed in a grid of silently spinning black and white turntables on pedestals, each turntable representing one police murder. Supporting the main sculpture is Archive II which displays documents associated with each case of police murder.

References

Living people
Artists from Missouri
San Francisco Art Institute alumni
Southern Methodist University faculty
University of North Texas alumni
1979 births